Rhynchozoon is a genus of bryozoans belonging to the family Phidoloporidae.

The genus has almost cosmopolitan distribution.

Species:

Rhynchozoon abscondum 
Rhynchozoon adamanteus 
Rhynchozoon angulatum 
Rhynchozoon ardeolum 
Rhynchozoon attina 
Rhynchozoon beatulum 
Rhynchozoon bifurcum 
Rhynchozoon bispinosum 
Rhynchozoon brasiliensis 
Rhynchozoon capoblanquense 
Rhynchozoon caribense 
Rhynchozoon celestinoi 
Rhynchozoon coalitum 
Rhynchozoon compactum 
Rhynchozoon complanatum 
Rhynchozoon confusum 
Rhynchozoon corniculatum 
Rhynchozoon corniger 
Rhynchozoon crenulatum 
Rhynchozoon curtum 
Rhynchozoon cutleriana 
Rhynchozoon decoratum 
Rhynchozoon delicatulum 
Rhynchozoon detectum 
Rhynchozoon digitatum 
Rhynchozoon discus 
Rhynchozoon documentum 
Rhynchozoon exigua 
Rhynchozoon ferocula 
Rhynchozoon fistulosum 
Rhynchozoon fulgidum 
Rhynchozoon glabrum 
Rhynchozoon globosum 
Rhynchozoon grandicella 
Rhynchozoon grandiporosum 
Rhynchozoon haha 
Rhynchozoon heteromorpha 
Rhynchozoon incallidum 
Rhynchozoon inclemens 
Rhynchozoon incomitatum 
Rhynchozoon incrassatum 
Rhynchozoon incurvata 
Rhynchozoon itaparicaensis 
Rhynchozoon krouzkovensis 
Rhynchozoon larreyi 
Rhynchozoon laterale 
Rhynchozoon latiavicularium 
Rhynchozoon leognanensis 
Rhynchozoon levigatum 
Rhynchozoon ligulatum 
Rhynchozoon limatulum 
Rhynchozoon lobulatum 
Rhynchozoon longirostris 
Rhynchozoon lunifrons 
Rhynchozoon maculosum 
Rhynchozoon monoceros 
Rhynchozoon multiformatatum 
Rhynchozoon nasutum 
Rhynchozoon neapolitanum 
Rhynchozoon notialis 
Rhynchozoon nudum 
Rhynchozoon obliquimandibulatum 
Rhynchozoon oscitans 
Rhynchozoon oslavanensis 
Rhynchozoon paa 
Rhynchozoon papuliferum 
Rhynchozoon phrynoglossum 
Rhynchozoon profundum 
Rhynchozoon pseudodigitatum 
Rhynchozoon ptarmicum 
Rhynchozoon pustulans 
Rhynchozoon quadratus 
Rhynchozoon quadrispinatum 
Rhynchozoon rosae 
Rhynchozoon rostratum 
Rhynchozoon ryukyuense 
Rhynchozoon scimitar 
Rhynchozoon scopulorum 
Rhynchozoon setiavicularium 
Rhynchozoon sexaspinatum 
Rhynchozoon solidum 
Rhynchozoon solitarium 
Rhynchozoon spicatum 
Rhynchozoon spiniferum 
Rhynchozoon splendens 
Rhynchozoon stomachosum 
Rhynchozoon taoraensis 
Rhynchozoon triangulare 
Rhynchozoon tristelidion 
Rhynchozoon tuberosum 
Rhynchozoon tubulosum 
Rhynchozoon tumulosum 
Rhynchozoon unispinatum 
Rhynchozoon verruculatum 
Rhynchozoon zealandicum

References

Bryozoan genera